Eulepidotis hemithea is a moth of the family Erebidae first described by Herbert Druce in 1889. It is found in the Neotropics, including Panama and Guyana.

References

Moths described in 1889
hemithea